Blastodacna vinolentella is a moth in the family Elachistidae. It is found in central and southern Europe, from the Netherlands to Greece.

The wingspan is 9–12 mm. Adults are on wing from the beginning of June to the beginning of August.

The larvae possibly feed on Vitis vinifera.

References

External links
Lepiforum e. V.

Moths described in 1838
Blastodacna
Moths of Europe